Water World (also known as, Hyland Hills Water World or Water World Colorado) is a water park that is part of the Hyland Hills Park and Recreation District and located in Federal Heights, Colorado, roughly  north of downtown Denver, Colorado. The park first opened in August 1979 with the first two waterslides in the state of Colorado, the Bonzai Pipeline. Water World is generally open from Memorial Day through Labor Day, but may be closed some school days.

The park occupies , making it one of America's largest water theme parks. In 2021, Amusement Today awarded Water World as the 5th best water park in the industry on their Golden Ticket Awards. , the park has 50 attractions including a multitude of water slides, a lazy river, inflatable tube rides, multi-guest inflatable raft rides, two wave pools, and a gondola, which offers access to and from the top of the park.

Water attractions
The park has several unique water attractions. One of the most notable is Screamin' Mimi, a ride where guests ride board-type vehicles down a roller coaster like track, reaching speeds of  before landing in a pool and bouncing across the water. Other notable attractions include Glacier Run, an 8-lane head first mat slide with several steep drops; The Revolution, a 4-person cloverleaf tube ride that leads down into a tube bowl; Storm, a 4-person tube dark slide; and TurboRacer, a racing slide that features eight side by side lanes and a timed open air finish.

Water World's most famous attraction is Journey to the Center of the Earth, in which riders ride in small circular multi-passenger inflatable rafts and travel through an artificial cavern. It is themed to a newly discovered cave that reportedly has creatures from the prehistoric era still inhabiting it. It includes steep downward spirals, sudden drop offs, and various dinosaurs, including an animatronic Tyrannosaurus encounter at the end of the ride. The ride is unusual for a water park attraction in its thematic emphasis, and in that it can take in excess of 5 minutes to complete, making it one of the longest rides at any water park. Since then, the ride has had two cosmetic upgrades, the most recent in the 2011 season. The Ride has a throughput capacity of over 1,000 guests per hour.

Water World has three wave pools: Turtle Bay, a very small wave pool for toddlers, Cowabunga Beach, a small wave pool, and Thunder Bay, a large pool which holds  of water. Thunder Bay features a large Pepsi advertisement on the pool floor. Thunder Bay also sports a new engine that generates multiple wave types. The only wave cycle available for guests simulates medium ocean waves creating crashing waves and strong currents in certain areas of the pool. Both have multiple points of emergency shut-offs used to immediately cut engine power from the wave rooms for added guest safety. 

In 1993, Water World installed The Fun House Express (now Alpine Springs Express) gondola connecting the lower and upper parts of the park. The fixed grip gondola, manufactured by Yan, was relocated to Water World from Circus Circus in Las Vegas, where it was lightly used. For most of its tenure at Water World, the gondola has circus theming at the bottom nodding to the origin of the lift. Some of the gondola towers are integrated into a The Peaks Speed Slides water slide platform. In 2021, Water World repainted and rethemed the bottom terminal.  

In 2012, Water World announced the Mile High Flyer, a hydro-magnetic water coaster which launches riders up and down five unique hills taking only 45 seconds to complete.

In 2017, Water World changed the former Captain Jack's wave pool into a smaller wave pool - Cowabunga Beach. This made room for Turtle Bay Kids Wave Pool directly next to Cowabunga Beach. Cowabunga Beach now acts as a Boogieboarding attraction during most hours through the day, but is open to as a play pool typically between 11:30 AM to 1:30 PM. 

The newest area of the park is the Big Top, located adjacent to TurboRacer. Big Top is family oriented and features attractions for younger children as well as thrill seekers. In 2021, Water World renovated the Big Top area to a re-imagined and Colorado-themed Alpine Springs area. The area features Colorado landmarks throughout the entire area and has two new attractions, Roaring Forks, a 2-lane water coaster, and Centennial Basin, a tube bowl.

The park was included on a 2008 Travel Channel list of the top 10 water parks in the United States. USA Today readers named Water World one of the top 10 water parks in America in August 2013.

In 2021, Water World received a Golden Ticket Award for being one of the best water parks in the industry. The awards are handed out based on surveys given to experienced and well-traveled amusement and water park enthusiasts from around the world.

Pop culture reference 

Water World was an inspiration for the South Park episode "Pee", which features a water park named Pi Pi's Splashtown. Many of the water parks rides appeared in the episode under slightly different names, including its most notable attraction Voyage to the Center of the Earth (retitled "Journey to the Center of the World"). 

The park was also featured in the 2006 film The Surfer King.

Technology 
Water World offers visitors a cashless payment option via RFID wristbands that can be preloaded with money at any POS terminal in the park. Season Passes (Splash Passes) can be upgraded to include a preloaded RFID cashless payment option. Water World also offers lockers that can be accessed via RFID wristbands. The wristbands are dispensed via a self-service kiosk located in Water World's locker rental area.  Unlike traditional single use lockers, the RFID wristbands allow users to access the locker multiple times throughout the day.

Incidents and accidents

In 2009, a lifeguard pulled a 48-year-old man from Captain Jack's Wave Pool (now Cowabunga Beach). Paramedics were unable to revive him. He was transported to the hospital and pronounced dead, with preliminary reports identifying drowning as the cause of death. This marked the first fatality in the park's history.

External links 
 Water World Official Website
 Hyland Hills Park and Recreation district

References 

1979 establishments in Colorado
Buildings and structures in Adams County, Colorado
Tourist attractions in Adams County, Colorado
Denver metropolitan area
Water parks in Colorado